Ahmed Hafez Mazhar (8 October 1917 – 8 May 2002) was an Egyptian actor. He graduated from the military academy in 1938 and his colleagues included Gamal Abdel Nasser and Anwar Sadat.

Career
His acting career started in 1951 when he was picked for a role in Zehour Al-Islam because of his riding skills and his proper pronunciation of classical Arabic. In 1957 he retired as commander of the special cavalry units and decided to explore his acting talents.

Mazhar's breakthrough in the world of acting came after he succeeded in playing the role of an evil prince in Ezz El-Dine Zulfikar’s Back Again (1957) alongside Shoukry Sarhan and Salah Zulfikar, his third movie. Other roles soon followed, including Jamila, the Algerian (1958) alongside Magda and Salah Zulfikar, Al-Tarik Al-Masdood (1958) opposite Faten Hamama, Al-Ataba Al-Khadraa (1959), Doaa al-Karawan (1959), Wa Islamah (1961), Al-Dowa Al-Khafet (1961) and Ghadan Youm Akhar (1961). He starred in an American movie, Cairo (1963), starring George Sanders and Faten Hamama. Then Saladin (1963) opposite Salah Zulfikar, Nadia Lutfi, among others. More than four years later, Mazhar appeared in Shafika and Metwali (1979) alongside Soad Hosny. Other films like Al-Nemr Al-Aswad, Demoue Sahebat El-Galalah, Al-Gasousa Hekmat Fahmy and The Guns and the Fury soon followed.

Death
Ahmed Mazhar died at home at age 85 in Giza in 2002.

Selected filmography

Zuhour el Islam (1951)
Rihlah Gharamiyyah (1957)
Rod Qalby (1957)
Port Said (1957)
El tarik el masdud (1958) - Mounir (writer)
El moallema (1958)
Djamilah (1958) - Youssef
Tarik el amal (1958)
Hatta naltaki (1958)
El zoja el azraa (1958) - Magdi
Doa al karawan (1959)
Nour el lail (1959)
El hub el akhir (1959)
El ataba el khadra (1959)
Ana baria (1959)
 (1959)
Talat warissat (1960)
Omm Ratiba (1960)
Lawet el hub (1960)
Hub fi hub (1960)
Oh Islam (1961) - Mahmoud
El dow' El khafet (1961)
Waada el hub (1961) - Hamda
 (1961)
Hayat wa amal (1961)
Hayati hial taman (1961) - Hussein Abdulsalam
 (1961)
Amalekat el behar (1961) - Officer Salah El Desoky
 (1962)
I Will Not Confess (1962) - Ahmed (husband)
Hira wa chebab (1962)
Ghosn el zeitoun (1962)
 (1962)
Cairo (1963) - Kerim
El motamarreda (1963)
El Naser Salah el Dine (1963) - Saladin
Nar fi Sadri (1963)
El Garima El Daheka (1963)
El-Lailah el-Akhirah (1963) - Dr. Ahmed
El aydi el naema (1963) - Shawkat Helmy
 (1963)
El lahab (1964)
Daani wal demouh (1964)
Bint Antar (1964)
El ainab el murr (1965)
 (1966)
El moraheka el saghira (1966)
Al-Kahira thalatin (1966)
Moaskar el banat (1967) - Hassan
El lekaa el tani (1967) - Raafat
Al moukhareboun (1967) - Adel
Losos Laken Dhurafa'a (1968) - Hamed
Noufouss haira (1968) - Rashwan
Bint min el banat (1968)
Ayyam el-hob (1968) - Sherif
Akazib hawa (1969)
Nadia (1969)
Al-hob wal-Thaman (1970)
Khatib mama (1970)
Emberatoriet meem (1972)
Kalimat Sharaf (1972)
Al Shayma, Prophet's Sister (1972) - Begad
Al-Reda' Al-Abiad (1975) - Ahmad Fathi
Genoun el hob (1977) - Mahmoud
Al omr lahza (1978)
Chafika et Metwal (1979)
The Guns and the Fury (1981) - Sheik Khazal Khan
Al Etehad Al Nessai (1984)

See also 
 CIFF Top 100 Egyptian films
 List of Egyptian films of the 1950s
 List of Egyptian films of the 1960s
 Soad Hosny filmography
 Salah Zulfikar filmography
 Faten Hamama filmography

References

External links
 
 Lesser Known Facts about Ahmed Mazhar on 104th Birth Anniversary

1917 births
2002 deaths
Egyptian male film actors
Male actors from Cairo
Disease-related deaths in Egypt
20th-century Egyptian male actors